Pommard is a commune in the Côte-d'Or department and Bourgogne-Franche-Comté region of eastern France.

Famous for its Côte de Beaune wine production, Pommard is situated directly south of Beaune along the Route des Grands Crus. The D973 runs through the village from Beaune and then on to Saisy and Autun.

Population

Wine

Like Nuits-Saint-Georges, the name of Pommard was made famous as a marketplace for wines from better areas, in the days before Appellation Controlee. The fact that its name is easy for foreigners to pronounce also helped. 130,000 cases produced from 337 hectares makes it the second biggest area by production after Beaune. 135 hectares of that is Premier Cru, of which Les Epenots and Les Rugiens are the most notable.

Pommard produces purely red wine - no whites.

Village
The square bell tower of its eighteenth-century church, characterise the village and on the hills that surround Pommard, the vineyards dominate the landscape.

International relations
Pommard is twinned with Nackenheim, Germany

See also
Communes of the Côte-d'Or department
Côte de Beaune

References

Further reading
 Coates, Clive (1997) Côte D'Or: A Celebration of the Great Wines of Burgundy Weidenfeld Nicolson

External links

 thewinedoctor.com A great overview of the geography and wines of Burgundy
 Details of the vineyards within the Côte de Beaune.
 www.netbourgogne.com In English also available
 The Burgundy Report Good descriptions of the vineyards and vintages.

Communes of Côte-d'Or